Gitta Lind (17 April 1925 – 9 November 1974) was a German singer and film actress.

Lind was born in Trier as Rita Maria Gracher. During her first employment as a singer she changed her name to Gitta Lind, a tribute to Gitta Alpár and Jenny Lind. She was married four times, in her second marriage from 1951 to 1954 to the actor Joachim Fuchsberger. She died in Tutzing and was buried in Trier.

Selected filmography
 Hit Parade (1953)
 Scandal at the Girls' School (1953)
 The Perfect Couple (1954)
 Music in the Blood (1955)
 My Wife Makes Music (1958)

References

Bibliography

External links

1925 births
1974 deaths
20th-century German actresses
German film actresses
People from Trier
20th-century German women singers